Viktor Viktorovych Khomchenko (born 11 November 1994) is a Ukrainian professional footballer who plays as a striker for Polish IV liga club Star Starachowice.

Career
Khomchenko attended the different Sportive youth schools in Volyn Oblast. He made his debut for FC Volyn Lutsk played as substituted in the game against FC Metalist Kharkiv on 6 April 2013 in the Ukrainian Premier League.

References

External links 
 
 

1994 births
Living people
Ukrainian footballers
Association football forwards
Ukrainian Premier League players
Ukrainian First League players
Ukrainian Second League players
IV liga players
FC Volyn Lutsk players
FC Karpaty Lviv players
FC Rukh Lviv players
FC Kramatorsk players
FC Hirnyk-Sport Horishni Plavni players
FC Karpaty Halych players
FC Uzhhorod players
Ukrainian expatriate footballers
Expatriate footballers in Poland
Ukrainian expatriate sportspeople in Poland